The Boxer Indemnities was an indemnity to which the Qing Empire of China committed itself in writing on 7 September 1901 in relation to the Western thirteen countries in the Boxer Rebellion.

Reasons of the compensation 
The reasons of the western countries for the compensation payments from Qing Empire of China are:
 Dispatch of combat troops to Qing Empire, cost of money and interest;
 Compensation for the loss of citizens, missionaries, merchants and businesses;
 Compensation for the loss of national churches;
 Compensation for the loss of Chinese Christians.

Amount of indemnities 

Repair payments have been defined: 450,000,000 table fine silver (approx. 67,5 million British pounds; Three hundred million US$ dollars) plus 4% interest. Over 39 years these were total 982,238,150 tablets (approx. 34.683 tons of silver) for the loss that China had caused to the Eighth Nations Alliance. The compensation payments were distributed as follows:

 Russian Empire 28.97 %
 German Empire 20.02 %
 French Third Republic 15.75 %
 British Empire 11.25 %
 Empire of Japan 7.73 %
 United States 7.32 %
 Kingdom of Italy 5.91 %
 Belgium 1.89 %
 Austria-Hungary 0.89 %
 Kingdom of the Netherlands 0.17 %
 Spain 0.030 %
 Kingdom of Portugal 0.020 %
 Union between Sweden and Norway 0.010 %

History 

As the United States had demanded less compensation than was then stipulated in the Boxer Rebellion, they converted the overcompensation received into a scholarship for Chinese students, which known as the Boxer Rebellion Indemnity Scholarship Program. Subsequently, The Empire of Japan and French Third Republic also used part of the compensation for young Chinese students to finance their studies. 

After the First World War, China's claims against defeated German Empire and Austria-Hungary were counterbalanced. After the October Revolution, the Soviet government granted an indemnity waiver in the 1920's regarding the Boxer Indemnities.

When China's compensation payments for the Boxer Indemnities ended in 1938, the actual compensation amount amounted to more than six hundred million silver dollars, converted around one billion yuan.

References 

Foreign relations of the Qing dynasty
1901 in China